Anderson José Lopes de Souza (born 15 September 1993), known as Anderson Lopes, is a Brazilian footballer who plays for Yokohama F. Marinos as a forward or a winger.

Club career

Brazil 
Born in Recife, Pernambuco, Anderson Lopes joined Avaí's youth setup in 2011, after starting it out at Internacional. He made his professional debut on 29 November 2013, coming on as a second-half substitute in a 1–0 home win against Boa Esporte.

In 2014 Anderson Lopes was loaned to Marcílio Dias. After scoring six goals in only 16 matches, he returned to Avaí, being assigned to the main squad in the second level.

On 14 May 2014 Anderson Lopes scored his first goals for Leão, netting a brace in a 2–1 home win against ASA, for the season's Copa do Brasil. He finished the year with 33 league appearances and four goals, also being promoted to Série A.

On 10 May 2015 Anderson Lopes made his Série A debut, starting in a 1–1 home draw against Santos.

Sanfrecce Hiroshima
On 10 July 2016, Anderson Lopes joined J1 League side Sanfrecce Hiroshima on loan.

FC Seoul
On 12 February 2018, Anderson Lopes joined K League 1 side FC Seoul on loan. In November 2018 he was removed from the matchday squad due to poor attitude and left the club at the end of the 2018 season, in which he scored 6 times in 30 league appearances.

Hokkaido Consadole Sapporo
On 1 January 2019, Anderson Lopes signed a one-year contract with J1 League side Hokkaido Consadole Sapporo.

Wuhan FC
On 3 July 2021, Anderson Lopez sign transfer to chinese club, Wuhan FC for during mid 2021 season.

Yokohama F. Marinos
On 3 February 2022, Anderson Lopez announcement officially transfer to J1 club, Yokohama F. Marinos for upcoming 2022 season. He debut with the club in 19 February at same year, Recorded 1 goal and 1 assist in the match against Cerezo Osaka in the first round of the J1 League, the first official match after joining the club. Although he has been performing well since the opening, he was sent off for spatting on the opponent's defender Daiki Miya in the match against Avispa Fukuoka in Matchweek 14, he was suspended for 6 games and fined 600,000 yen. In the league match, he scored 11 points in team tie with Leo Ceara and contributed to the team's league victory.

Career Statistics

Club 

.

Honours

Club
Yokohama F. Marinos
 J1 League: 2022

References

External links
Anderson Lopes at playmakerstats.com (English version of ogol.com.br)

1993 births
Living people
Sportspeople from Recife
Brazilian footballers
Association football forwards
Campeonato Brasileiro Série A players
Campeonato Brasileiro Série B players
Avaí FC players
Clube Náutico Marcílio Dias players
Club Athletico Paranaense players
Sanfrecce Hiroshima players
FC Seoul players
Hokkaido Consadole Sapporo players
Wuhan F.C. players
Yokohama F. Marinos players
J1 League players
K League 1 players
Chinese Super League players
Brazilian expatriate footballers
Expatriate footballers in Japan
Expatriate footballers in South Korea
Expatriate footballers in China
Brazilian expatriate sportspeople in Japan
Brazilian expatriate sportspeople in South Korea
Brazilian expatriate sportspeople in China